Eupithecia dealbata is a moth in the family Geometridae. It is found in Taiwan.

References

Moths described in 1988
dealbata
Moths of Taiwan